The Our Lady of Fatima Cathedral also called Metropolitan Cathedral of Our Lady of Fatima, is a religious building of the Catholic Church which is in Nampula, a town in the African country of Mozambique, which functions as the cathedral of the Archdiocese of Nampula.

The cathedral was inaugurated in 1956 by the then President of the Republic of Portugal, Francisco Craveiro Lopes when the territory was under Portuguese rule. It is a traditionalist design building, designed by Raul Lino and built between 1941, a year after the founding of the diocese, and 1955. It has two towers in the facade and an arched portico.

See also
Roman Catholicism in Mozambique
Our Lady of Fatima Church

References

Roman Catholic cathedrals in Mozambique
Buildings and structures in Nampula
Roman Catholic churches completed in 1955
1956 establishments in Mozambique
Portuguese colonial architecture in Mozambique
20th-century Roman Catholic church buildings